Robert Lyons II (born January 22, 1989) is an American professional stock car racing driver. He competes part-time in the ARCA Menards Series, driving the No. 42 Chevrolet SS for Cook Racing Technologies. He has also competed part-time NASCAR Xfinity Series and in the NASCAR Camping World Truck Series in the past.

Racing career

Early career
Lyons started his racing career at the age of six, racing dirt bikes. Lyons raced dirt bikes for over a decade, winning two Florida championships.  After injuring both legs in a crash when he was fifteen, Lyons quit bike racing at eighteen.  He then moved to Legends car racing after seeing former motocross racer Ricky Carmichael transition. After Legends cars, Lyons competed in the Pro All-Stars Series in 2014. In December 2014, Lyons tested at Daytona International Speedway in an ARCA Racing Series car that was prepared by both Rick Ware Racing and MacDonald Motorsports. In early 2015, Lyons joined Chad Finley and his team as a development driver to compete in the 2015 CARS Tour; Lyons wound up only running three of the races. Lyons made a return to the CARS Tour in 2017 and also competed in the Short Track Nationals at Bristol Motor Speedway.

NASCAR
Lyons announced on November 9, 2017 that he would be making his NASCAR debut in the Camping World Truck Series, driving for Premium Motorsports at Phoenix International Raceway. His effort was led by former NASCAR driver Brian Keselowski as crew chief. The pairing came together after Lyons and Premium owner Jay Robinson met at Charlotte Motor Speedway in fall 2017. After accidents eliminated the majority of the field, Lyons finished 12th in his Truck debut. In his debut, Lyons was almost wrecked by teammate Jason Hathaway near the end of the race but survived. During the week after the Phoenix race, Lyons was approved for all of NASCAR's 1.5-mile tracks, leading to a second race with Premium a week later for the Truck season finale at Homestead-Miami Speedway, where he finished 24th.

On January 23, 2018, it was announced that Lyons would drive Premium's No. 15 truck full-time in 2018. However, Lyons was replaced by Reed Sorenson for Dover race due to sponsorship. He was scheduled to race in Texas before being pulled for Sorenson for health issues. Following medical tests in June, Lyons revealed he was suffering from neurological issues affecting his heart rate and blood pressure, forcing him out of competing in the month's races. Later on, after listening to Dale Earnhardt Jr.'s story about concussions, Lyons got treatment after recognizing symptoms and got treatment for concussions. Eventually, Lyons and Premium split and in summer 2018, Lyons purchased his trucks, which debuted at Talladega Superspeedway with the number 33, owner points coming from Reaume Brothers Racing. The Talladega truck was purchased from Josh Reaume, while Lyons also acquired a couple of old Brad Keselowski Racing chassis.

In 2019, Lyons joined Chad Finley Racing for a part-time schedule in the No. 42 Silverado, sharing the truck with owner Chad Finley. At the end of the season, he made his NASCAR Xfinity Series debut in the Ford EcoBoost 300 at Homestead–Miami Speedway with Rick Ware Racing. 

Lyons joined JD Motorsports for the first three Xfinity races in 2020. He also raced at Talladega. He returned to the Truck Series in June at Pocono Raceway, driving for Diversified Motorsports Enterprises.

In 2021, Lyons returned to the Xfinity Series, joining MBM Motorsports to drive their No. 61 Toyota for the season-opener at Daytona as well as the possibility of additional races later in the year.

Personal life
Lyons grew up in Clearwater, Florida. He soon took after his dad Bob Lyons who was a well known drag racer and became a dirt bike racer until the age of 18. After moving to stock car racing, Lyons became good friends with Xfinity Series driver Garrett Smithley. Lyons is also a user of the online racing simulator iRacing. He graduated from Indian Rocks Christian School.

Motorsports career results

NASCAR
(key) (Bold – Pole position awarded by qualifying time. Italics – Pole position earned by points standings or practice time. * – Most laps led.)

Xfinity Series

Gander RV & Outdoors Truck Series

ARCA Menards Series
(key) (Bold – Pole position awarded by qualifying time. Italics – Pole position earned by points standings or practice time. * – Most laps led. ** – All laps led.)

 Season still in progress
 Ineligible for series points

References

External links
 
 

NASCAR drivers
1989 births
Racing drivers from Florida
Living people
sportspeople from Clearwater, Florida